Klidson Abreu (born 24 December 1992) is a Brazilian mixed martial artist competing in the Heavyweight division. He formerly competed in the Ultimate Fighting Championship (UFC) and Professional Fighters League (PFL).

Mixed martial arts career

Early career
Abreu compiled a professional mixed martial arts record of 14-2 fighting within the Brazilian regional MMA circuit as well as in Paraguay, United Arab Emirates and Russia for over 7 years winning various regional MMA titles before signing for UFC in January 2019.

Ultimate Fighting Championship
Abreu made his UFC debut at light heavyweight against Magomed Ankalaev on 23 February 2019 at UFC Fight Night: Błachowicz vs. Santos. He lost the fight via unanimous decision.

Abreu then faced Sam Alvey on 20 July 2019 at UFC on ESPN: dos Anjos vs. Edwards. He won the fight via unanimous decision.

Abreu next faced Shamil Gamzatov on 9 November 2019 at UFC Fight Night: Magomedsharipov vs. Kattar. He lost the fight via split decision.

Abreu was initially targeted to face Gadzhimurad Antigulov on 13 June 2020 at UFC Kazakhstan. Subsequently, the Kazakhstan event was later cancelled due to the COVID-19 pandemic. As a result, Abreu was rescheduled to face Jamahal Hill on 30 May 2020 at UFC on ESPN: Woodley vs. Burns. He initially lost the fight via technical knockout in the first round, but the fight was later overturned on 3 September because Hill tested positive for marijuana.

On 10 August 2020, it was announced that the UFC released him.

Professional Fighters League 
On 1 June 2021, it was announced that Abreu was signed by the PFL and he made his debut on 25 June 2021 at PFL 6 against Jamelle Jones. He lost the bout after being knocked out in the first round.

Klidson was scheduled to face Ali Isaev on April 28, 2022 at PFL 2. However, Isaev pulled out of the bout and was replaced by Adam Keresh. He won the bout via unanimous decision.

Klidson faced Renan Ferreira on June 24, 2022 at PFL 5. In an upset, Klidson won the bout via unanimous decision. The Georgia Athletic and Entertainment Commission overturned the result of the bout to a no contest,  after Abreu failed a drug test for unspecified substances. Klidson and his team contended that the positive was due to prescribed antibiotics for a leg laceration.

Championships and accomplishments 

Brave Combat Federation
 Brave CF Light Heavyweight Championship (One time) 
 One successful title defence 
Samurai Fight Combat
 Samurai FC Heavyweight Championship (One time)

Mixed martial arts record

|-
|NC
|align=center|16–5 (2)
|Renan Ferreira
|NC (overturned)
|PFL 5
|
|align=center|3
|align=center|5:00
|Atlanta, Georgia, United States
|
|-
|Win
|align=center|16–5 (1)
|Adam Keresh
|Decision (unanimous)
|PFL 2
|
|align=center|3
|align=center|5:00
|Arlington, Texas, United States
|
|-
|Loss
|align=center|15–5 (1)
|Jamelle Jones
|KO (punches)
|PFL 6
|
|align=center|1
|align=center|1:43
|Atlantic City, New Jersey, United States
|
|-
|NC
|align=center|15–4 (1)
|Jamahal Hill
|NC (overturned)
|UFC on ESPN: Woodley vs. Burns
|
|align=center|1
|align=center|1:51
|Las Vegas, Nevada, United States
|
|-
|Loss
|align=center|15–4
|Shamil Gamzatov
|Decision (split)
|UFC Fight Night: Magomedsharipov vs. Kattar
|
|align=center|3
|align=center|5:00
|Moscow, Russia
|
|-
|Win
|align=center|15–3
|Sam Alvey
|Decision (unanimous)
|UFC on ESPN: dos Anjos vs. Edwards
|
|align=center|3
|align=center|5:00
|San Antonio, Texas, United States
|
|-
|Loss
|align=center|14–3
|Magomed Ankalaev
|Decision (unanimous)
|UFC Fight Night: Błachowicz vs. Santos
|
|align=center|3
|align=center|5:00
|Prague, Czech Republic
|
|-
|Win
|align=center|14–2
|Anton Vyazigin
|Submission (straight armbar)
|M-1 Challenge 99: Battle of Narts
|
|align=center|2
|align=center|3:16
|Nazran, Ingushetia, Russia
|
|-
|Win
|align=center|13–2
|Viktor Nemkov
|Submission (rear-naked choke)
| Russian Cagefighting Championship 3
|
|align=center|2
|align=center|1:02
|Yekaterinburg, Russia
|
|-
|Win
|align=center|12–2
|Matt Baker
|Submission (rear-naked choke)
|Brave CF 11: Mineiro vs. Santiago
|
|align=center|1
|align=center|3:01
|Belo Horizonte, Minas Gerais, Brazil
|
|-
|Win
|align=center|11–2
|Timo Feucht
|Submission (armbar)
|Brave CF 8: The Rise of Champions
|
|align=center|2
|align=center|4:01
|Curitiba, Parana, Brazil
|
|-
|Win
|align=center|10–2
|Artur Guseinov
|Submission (rear-naked choke)
|Brave 4: Unstoppable
|
|align=center|1
|align=center|3:42
|Abu Dhabi, United Arab Emirates
|
|-
|Win
|align=center|9–2
|Leonardo Silva de Oliveira
|TKO (doctors stoppage)
|Jungle Fight 90
|
|align=center|3
|align=center|1:58
|Sao Paulo, Brazil
|
|-
|Loss
|align=center|8–2
|Bruno Cappelozza
|TKO (punches)
|Jungle Fight 87
|
|align=center|3
|align=center|3:08
|Sao Paulo, Brazil
|
|-
|Win
|align=center|8–1
|Johnny Walker
|Submission (rear-naked choke)
|Samurai FC 12
|
|align=center|2
|align=center|3:10
|Curitiba, Parana, Brazil
|
|-
|Win
|align=center|7–1
|Morris Albert Lins
|TKO (punches)
|Sierra Fighting Championship 1
|
|align=center|1
|align=center|1:06
|Orleans, Santa Catarina, Brazil
|
|-
|Loss
|align=center|6–1
|Peterson Leite
|TKO (punches)
|Extreme Fighter 6
|
|align=center|3
|align=center|4:16
|Pedro Juan Caballero, Paraguay
|
|-
|Win
|align=center|6–0
|Eli Reger Schablatura Pinto
|Submission
|West Combat 1
|
|align=center|1
|align=center|1:55
|Marechal Cândido Rondon, Parana, Brazil
|
|-
|Win
|align=center|5–0
|Alex Junius
|Submission (rear-naked choke)
|Mr. Fighter Combat
|
|align=center|2
|align=center|4:10
|Toledo, Parana, Brazil
|
|-
|Win
|align=center|4–0
|Matheus Scheffel
|Submission (rear-naked choke)
|Beltrao Combat 2
|
|align=center|1
|align=center|0:46
|Morretes, Parana, Brazil
|
|-
|Win
|align=center|3–0
|Ari Souza
|KO (punches)
|Ring of Fire 4
|
|align=center|1
|align=center|3:02
|Presidente Venceslau, Sao Paulo, Brazil
|
|-
|Win
|align=center|2–0
|Jose Rodolfo Goncalves Firmino
|TKO 
|Beltrao Combat
|
|align=center|1
|align=center|0:40
|Francisco Beltrao, Parana, Brazil
|
|-
|Win
|align=center|1–0
|Jeferson Miranda
|Submission
|Cruzeiro Combat
|
|align=center|1
|align=center|
|Cruzeiro do Iguaçu, Parana, Brazil
|
|-

See also 
 List of male mixed martial artists

References

External links 
 Klidson Abreu at PFL
 
 

1992 births
Living people
People from Manaus
Brazilian male mixed martial artists
Light heavyweight mixed martial artists
Ultimate Fighting Championship male fighters
Sportspeople from Curitiba